The 2013 Pacific Rugby Cup was the eighth edition of the Pacific Rugby Cup competition.  The tournament featured national 'A' teams from Fiji, Samoa, and Tonga, and the Junior Japan team which was added for the 2013 tournament. The format involved touring to play against Super Rugby development teams from Australia and New Zealand, and was intended include a round robin stage between the four core teams, but this leg of the tournament was cancelled to allow preparation for the end-of-year internationals.

Teams

The four core teams:
 Fiji Warriors 

 

Australian opposition:
 ACT XV
 Junior Waratahs
 Rebel Rising
 Reds College XV
 Western Force A 
 ARU Brisbane Academy
 ARU Sydney Academy

New Zealand opposition:
 Blues Development 
 Chiefs Development
 Crusaders Knights 
 Highlanders Development
 Hurricanes Development

Table

Core Teams
{| class="wikitable"
|-
!width=165|Team
!width=40|Played
!width=40|Won
!width=40|Drawn
!width=40|Lost
!width=40|For
!width=40|Against
!width=40|Diff
!width=40|BP1
!width=40|BP2
!width=40|Pts
|-  style="background:#cfc; text-align:center;"
|align=left|  Fiji Warriors || 6 || 2 || 2 || 2 || 118 || 155 || -37 || 2 || 0 || 14
|- style="text-align:center;"
|align=left|  || 6 || 2 || 0 || 4 || 134 || 198 || -64 || 1 || 1 || 10
|- style="text-align:center;"
|align=left|  || 6 || 0 || 0 || 6 || 140 || 361 ||-221 || 3 || 0 ||  3
|- style="text-align:center;"
|align=left|  || 6 || 0 || 0 || 6 ||  73 || 306 ||-233 || 0 || 0 ||  0

|- bgcolor="#ffffff" align=center
|colspan="15"|Updated: 7 April 2013Source: oceaniarugby.com
|}
{| class="wikitable collapsible collapsed" style="text-align:center; line-height:100%; font-size:100%; width:60%;"
|-
! colspan="4" style="border:0px" |Competition rules
|-
| colspan="4" | Points breakdown:4 points for a win2 points for a draw1 bonus point for a loss by seven points or less1 bonus point for scoring four or more tries in a match
Classification:Teams standings are calculated as follows:Most log points accumulated from all matchesMost log points accumulated in matches between tied teamsHighest difference between points scored for and against accumulated from all matchesMost points scored accumulated from all matches
|}

New Zealand conference

Australian conference

Matches

References

External links
FORU website 

World Rugby Pacific Challenge
2013 rugby union tournaments for national teams
Pacific Rugby Cup
Pacific Rugby Cup
Pacific Rugby Cup
Pacific Rugby Cup
Pacific Rugby Cup
Pacific Rugby Cup
Pacific